Back to Sherwood is a British-Canadian television series that originally aired on CBC Television in 1998. Created by Ellis Iddon and Phil Meagher of Winklemania Productions (UK). The theme music was also written and performed by Ellis Iddon and Phil Meagher.

Plot overview
When Robyn Hood finds a magical amulet, she finds that she can go back in time to the medieval age in England when she puts it on.  In the past, she learns that Robin Hood and Maid Marian have been captured and trapped by magical means by a sorceress in league with the Sheriff of Nottingham.  As their descendant, Robyn and her own group of merry teens must save her ancestors and protect Sherwood.

Cast
 Alexa Dubreuil as Joan Little
 Alexa Devine as Joan Little
 Aimée Castle as Robyn Hood
 Larry Day as Guy of Gisbourne
 Angela Galuppo as Tanya
 Anik Matern as Brenan the witch

Reception
Back to Sherwood currently stands at a 7.6 based on 33 reviews on IMDb.

References

External links

1998 Canadian television series debuts
1998 Canadian television series endings
CBC Television original programming
1990s Canadian children's television series
1990s Canadian time travel television series
Canadian time travel television series
British time travel television series